The 22nd Tank Division (Military Unit Number 5389) was a Division sized unit of the Red Army that existed from March 1941–July 1941.

Formed in March 1941 and stationed in western Belarus, the division was destroyed in the Battle of Białystok–Minsk in June of the same year.

History of division formation 

The division began forming in February–March 1941 in the Western special military district as part of the 14th mechanized corps at the base of the 29th tank brigade in the southern military town on the outskirts of Brest.

The division was equipped with 235 tanks, most of which were the obsolete T-26. The corps had half of its authorized 375 tanks.

Battle 
The German artillery bombardment on the morning of 22 June destroyed much of the 22nd Tank Division's fuel, supplies, and ammunition at Brest.

A tank battalion from the 22nd Tank Division was sent towards the river and was unable to stop the crossing.

Attacking on the morning of 23 June, the 200 T-26s of the 22nd and 30th destroyed numerous German tanks but suffered heavier losses.

The German forces continued their attack, inflicting heavy losses on the 22nd Tank Division and killing Puganov.

Formation 
The division was formed in March 1941 and had the following structure:
 43rd Tank Regiment
 44th Tank Regiment
 22nd Motorized Rifle Regiment
 22nd Motorized Howitzer Regiment
 22nd Reconnaissance Battalion
 22nd Motorized Anti-Aircraft Artillery Battalion
 22nd Motorized Pontoon Battalion
 663rd Field Post Office
 568th State Bank Field office

References

Bibliography
  
 

Tank divisions of the Soviet Union
Tank divisions of the Soviet Union in World War II
1941 establishments in the Soviet Union
1941 disestablishments in the Soviet Union